William Orr (9 December 1875 – 1912) was a Scottish footballer who played in the Football League for Glossop and Manchester City.

References

1875 births
1912 deaths
Scottish footballers
Footballers from Ayr
English Football League players
Association football defenders
Ayr Parkhouse F.C. players
Glossop North End A.F.C. players
Fulham F.C. players
Watford F.C. players